Bruce Ernest Logan is an American civil and environmental engineer who serves as the Kappe Professor of Environmental Engineering and the Evan Pugh University Professor in Engineering at Pennsylvania State University (Penn State). He is also the director of Penn State's Engineering Energy and Environmental Institute and their Hydrogen Energy Center. His main research interest is in the development of water infrastructure technology, and his lab has developed devices that can produce electricity from wastewater. He is also known for his work developing microbial fuel cells. Since 2013, he has been the editor-in-chief of Environmental Science & Technology Letters, and a fellow of the American Association for the Advancement of Science. He is also an elected member of the National Academy of Engineering (2013) for microbial electrochemical technologies for wastewater treatment and sustainable energy generation.

References

External links
Logan Lab Page

Editor profile at Environmental Science & Technology Letters

Living people
Pennsylvania State University faculty
Members of the United States National Academy of Engineering
American civil engineers
Rensselaer Polytechnic Institute alumni
UC Berkeley College of Engineering alumni
Academic journal editors
Environmental engineers
Fellows of the American Association for the Advancement of Science
Foreign members of the Chinese Academy of Engineering
Year of birth missing (living people)
Fellows of the Association of Environmental Engineering and Science Professors